Masao Yoshida may refer to:

, Japanese baseball player
, Japanese nuclear engineer
 , former House of Councillors member for the Niigata at-large district
 Masao Yoshida (flutist) (1915-2003), Japanese musician who studied with André Jaunet
 Masao Yoshida (sailor) (born 1932), Japanese Olympic sailor